Dhamna Dam, is an earthfill dam on local river near Bhokardan, Jalna district in state of Maharashtra in India.

Specifications

Purpose
 Irrigation

See also
 Dams in Maharashtra
 List of reservoirs and dams in India

References

Dams in Jalna district
Dams completed in 1974
1974 establishments in Maharashtra